Gresta is a surname. Notable people with the surname include:

Antonio Gresta (1671–1727), Italian painter
Bibop Gresta (born Gabriele Gresta in 1971), Italian businessman